Jimmy Hogg is a Scottish former professional football left-back who played for Aberdeen.

Hogg was appointed captain of Aberdeen in 1962, but was released in 1965 when he signed for Inverness Caledonian in the Scottish Highland Football League.

Career statistics

Club 
Appearances and goals by club, season and competition

References

Year of birth missing
Possibly living people
Association football fullbacks
Scottish footballers
Aberdeen F.C. players
Scottish Football League players
Preston Athletic F.C. players
Caledonian F.C. players